This is a list of members of the 8th National Assembly of South Korea which sat from 26 July 1971 until 17 December 1972.

Members

Seoul

Busan

Gyeonggi

Gangwon

North Chungcheong

South Chungcheong

North Jeolla

South Jeolla

North Gyeongsang

South Gyeongsang

Jeju

Proportional representation

Notes

See also 

 1971 South Korean legislative election
 National Assembly (South Korea)#History

References 

008
National Assembly members 008